Chambardia wissmanni is a species of bivalve in the family Iridinidae. It is endemic to Burundi.  Its natural habitat is rivers.

References

Unionida
Endemic fauna of Burundi
Invertebrates of Burundi
Molluscs of Africa
Freshwater bivalves
Molluscs described in 1883
Taxonomy articles created by Polbot